Mahmoud Omar Fawzy (born 10 October 1919) was an Egyptian wrestler. He competed in the men's Greco-Roman flyweight at the 1952 Summer Olympics.

References

External links
 

1919 births
Possibly living people
Egyptian male sport wrestlers
Olympic wrestlers of Egypt
Wrestlers at the 1952 Summer Olympics
Place of birth missing